Robat is a city in Kermanshah Province, Iran.

Robat, the Farsi variant of Arabic ribat, initially referred to an Early Islamic frontier fort, and later to a caravanserai or Sufi retreat. Some places named Robat are:

Afghanistan
Robat, Afghanistan

Iran

Fars Province
Robat, Fars, a village in Mamasani County

Hamadan Province
Robat-e Zafarani, a village in Bahar County
Robat-e Sheverin, a village in Hamadan County

Isfahan Province
Robat-e Abu ol Qasem, a village in Golpayegan County
Robat-e Mahmud, a village in Golpayegan County
Robat-e Malek, a village in Golpayegan County
Robat-e Qaleqan, a village in Golpayegan County
Robat-e Sorkh-e Olya, a village in Golpayegan County

Kerman Province
Robat, Kerman, a village in Kerman County
Robat, Shahr-e Babak, a village in Shahr-e Babak County

Khuzestan Province
Robat-e Olya, Khuzestan, a village in Bagh-e Malek County
Robat-e Sofla, Khuzestan, a village in Bagh-e Malek County

Lorestan Province
Robat, alternate name of Dowlatabad, Khorramabad
Robat-e Namaki, a village in Khorramabad County
Robat Rural District (Lorestan Province)

Markazi Province
Robat Mil, a village in Arak County
Robat Tork, a village in Delijan County
Robat-e Aghaj, a village in Khomeyn County
Robat-e Aliabad, a village in Khomeyn County
Robat-e Arjomand, a village in Khomeyn County
Robat-e Kafsan, a village in Khomeyn County
Robat-e Morad, a village in Khomeyn County
Robat-e Olya, Markazi, a village in Khomeyn County
Robat-e Sofla, Markazi, a village in Khomeyn County

North Khorasan Province
Robat, North Khorasan, a village in Shirvan County

Razavi Khorasan Province
Robat, Firuzeh, a village in Firuzeh County
Robat-e Sar Pashideh, a village in Firuzeh County
Robat, Kalat, a village in Kalat County
Robat, Zavin, a village in Kalat County
Robat-e Jaz, a village in Khoshab County
Robat-e Jaz Rural District, in Khoshab County
Robat, Mashhad, a village in Mashhad County
Robat-e Khakestari, a village in Mashhad County
Robat-e Sharaf, 12th-century ribat
Robat-e Toroq, a village in Mashhad County
Robat Sefid, a village in Mashhad County
Robat-e Sar Push, a village in Sabzevar County
Robat-e Mian Dasht, a village in Torbat-e Heydarieh County
Robat, Torbat-e Jam, a village in Torbat-e Jam County
Robat-e Samangan, a village in Torbat-e Jam County

Semnan Province
Robat-e Zang, a village in Shahrud County

South Khorasan Province
Robat, South Khorasan, a village in Darmian County
Robat-e Khan, a village in Tabas County

Yazd Province
Robat-e Posht-e Badam, a village in Ardakan County

Zanjan Province
Robat, Zanjan, a village in Khodabandeh County

Turkmenistan
Kizil-Robát ("Red Caravanserai"), Russified to Kizil-Arvát, the ribat that gave its name to a town recently renamed to Serdar

See also
Rabad, Central Asian variant for Semitic word 'rabat'
Rabat (disambiguation), Semitic word for 'fortified town' or 'suburb'
Ribat, Arabic word for Early Muslim frontier fort (later caravansary, Sufi retreat), the origin of the Persian word 'robat'
Ribat-i Malik, also spelled Rabat Malik - a ruined caravanserai on in Uzbekistan
Robat Rural District (disambiguation)

References